Purav Raja and Divij Sharan were the defending champions but chose not to compete.

Benjamin Mitchell and Jordan Thompson defeated Go Soeda and Yasutaka Uchiyama in the final, 6–3, 6–2, to win the title.

Seeds

Draw

Draw

References
 Main Draw

Shimadzu All Japan Indoor Tennis Championships - Doubles
2015 Doubles